A Passion to Kill is a 1994 American mystery thriller film directed by Rick King and starring Scott Bakula, Chelsea Field and Sheila Kelley.

Cast
Scott Bakula as David
Chelsea Field as Diana
Sheila Kelley as Beth
John Getz as Jerry
Rex Smith as Ted
France Nuyen as Lou Mazaud
Eddie Velez as Morales
Michael Warren as Martindale

References

External links
 

1990s mystery thriller films
American mystery thriller films
Rysher Entertainment films
1990s English-language films
Films directed by Rick King
1990s American films